Donovan Raiola (born December 13, 1982) is a former American football center and current offensive line coach for the Nebraska Cornhuskers.  He was signed by the St. Louis Rams as an undrafted free agent in 2006. He played college football at Wisconsin. He played high school football at Kamehameha Schools in Honolulu, Hawaii.

Raiola has also been a member of the Pittsburgh Steelers, St. Louis Rams, Seattle Seahawks, Arizona Cardinals, Chicago Bears, Tampa Bay Buccaneers and Washington Redskins. He is the younger brother of former Nebraska and NFL center Dominic Raiola.

College career
At Wisconsin, Raiola started 39 games and was a team captain for his senior year. He was named an honorable mention to the All-Big Ten Conference team three times.

Professional career

Omaha Nighthawks
Raiola was signed by the Omaha Nighthawks of the United Football League on September 8, 2010.

Tampa Bay Buccaneers
On December 7, 2010, Raiola was signed by the Buccaneers to replace injured starter Jeff Faine.

Washington Redskins
Raiola signed with the Washington Redskins on August 4, 2011.

Coaching career
Raiola served as an intern for the Hawaii Rainbow Warriors football team before joining the Notre Dame Fighting Irish as a graduate assistant, reuniting him with his former offensive line coach with both the Bears and Notre Dame, Harry Hiestand. Hiestand returned to the Bears in 2018, and Raiola followed to serve as the assistant offensive line coach. Raiola coached with the Bears in this capacity through Week 13 of the 2021 NFL season, when he departed to become the offensive line coach for the Nebraska Cornhuskers.

References

External links
 Nebraska profile
 Seattle Seahawks profile

1982 births
Living people
American football centers
Arizona Cardinals players
Aurora Spartans football coaches
Chicago Bears players
Hawaii Rainbow Warriors football coaches
Nebraska Cornhuskers football coaches
Notre Dame Fighting Irish football coaches
Omaha Nighthawks players
Pittsburgh Steelers players
Seattle Seahawks players
St. Louis Rams players
Tampa Bay Buccaneers players
Washington Redskins players
Wisconsin Badgers football players
High school football coaches in Hawaii
Kamehameha Schools alumni
Coaches of American football from Hawaii
Players of American football from Honolulu
Native Hawaiian people